The 2022 Food City Dirt Race was a NASCAR Cup Series race held on April 17, 2022, at Bristol Motor Speedway in Bristol, Tennessee. Contested over 250 laps on the  short track, it was the ninth race of the 2022 NASCAR Cup Series season.
This would turn out to be Kyle Busch's last win for Joe Gibbs Racing.

Report

Background

Bristol Motor Speedway, formerly known as Bristol International Raceway and Bristol Raceway, is a NASCAR short track venue located in Bristol, Tennessee. Constructed in 1960, it held its first NASCAR race on July 30, 1961. Bristol is among the most popular tracks on the NASCAR schedule because of its distinct features, which include extraordinarily steep banking combined with short length, an all concrete surface, two pit roads, and stadium-like seating.

In 2021, the race shifted to a dirt surface version of the track and was renamed the Food City Dirt Race.

Entry list
 (R) denotes rookie driver.
 (i) denotes driver who is ineligible for series driver points.

Practice

First practice

Final practice

Qualifying heat races

Qualifying race procedure similar to that used by the Chili Bowl qualifying nights and Bryan Clauson Classic.  Starting order for heat races based on random draw.  Grid determined by a combination of passing points and finishing points.  Ties broken by owner points.

Race 1

Race 2

Race 3

Race 4

Starting Lineup

Race

Stage Results

Stage One
Laps: 75

Stage Two
Laps: 75

Final Stage Results

Stage Three
Laps: 100

Race statistics
 Lead changes: 6 among 5 different drivers
 Cautions/Laps: 14 for 82
 Red flags: 1 for 16 minutes and 51 seconds
 Time of race: 3 hours, 34 minutes and 27 seconds
 Average speed:

Media

Television
The Food City Dirt Race was carried by Fox in the United States. Mike Joy, Clint Bowyer and 12-time Bristol winner – and all-time Bristol race winner – Darrell Waltrip called the race from the broadcast booth, his first since the 2019 Toyota/Save Mart 350 when he retired from commentary duties. Jamie Little and Regan Smith handled pit road for the television side. Larry McReynolds provided insight also from pit road.

Radio
PRN had the radio call for the race which was simulcasted on Sirius XM NASCAR Radio. Doug Rice and Mark Garrow called the race in the booth when the field raced down the frontstretch. Rob Albright called the race from atop the turn 3 suites when the field raced down the backstretch. Brad Gillie, Brett McMillan, Lenny Batycki and Alan Cavanna covered the action on pit lane for PRN.

Standings after the race

Drivers' Championship standings

Manufacturers' Championship standings

Note: Only the first 16 positions are included for the driver standings.
. – Driver has clinched a position in the NASCAR Cup Series playoffs.

References

Food City Dirt Race
Food City Dirt Race
Food City Dirt Race
NASCAR races at Bristol Motor Speedway